The second cabinet of Ion Antonescu was the government of Romania from 14 September 1940 to 24 January 1941. On September 14, Romania was declared a "National-Legionary State". On 23 November 1940, Romania joined the Axis powers. The cabinet ended in a failed coup.

Ministers
The ministers of the cabinet were as follows:

President of the Council of Ministers:
Gen. Ion Antonescu (14 September 1940 - 24 January 1941)
Vice President of the Council of Ministers:
Horia Sima (14 September 1940 - 20 January 1941)
Mihai A. Antonescu (20 - 24 January 1941)
Minister of State Secretary for the Department of Foreign Affairs: 
Mihail R. Sturdza (14 September 1940 - 20 January 1941)
Gen. Ion Antonescu (20 - 24 January 1941)
Minister of State Secretary for the Department of Internal Affairs:
Gen. Constantin Petrovicescu (14 September 1940 - 20 January 1941)
Gen. Dumitru I. Popescu (20 - 24 January 1941)
Minister of State Secretary for the Department of Justice:
Mihai A. Antonescu (14 September 1940 - 24 January 1941)
Minister of State Secretary for the Department of National Defence:
Gen. Ion Antonescu (14 September 1940 - 24 January 1941)
Minister of State Secretary for the Department of National Economy:
Gheorghe N. Leon (14 September - 10 November 1940)
Mircea Cancicov (10 November 1940 - 24 January 1941)
Minister of State Secretary for the Department of Finance:
George Cretzianu (14 September 1940 - 24 January 1941)
Minister of State Secretary for the Department of Agriculture and Property
Nicolae Mareș (14 September 1940 - 24 January 1941)
Minister of State Secretary for the Department of Public Works and Communications:
Pompiliu Nicolau (14 September - 23 October 1940)
Ion Protopopescu (23 October 1940 - 23 January 1941)
Minister of State Secretary for the Department of Labour, Health and Social Security:
Vasile Iașinschi (14 September 1940 - 21 January 1941)
Minister of State Secretary for the Department of National Education, Religious Affairs and the Arts:
Traian Brăileanu (14 September 1940 - 21 January 1941)
Minister of State Secretary for Coordination and Economic Status:
Lt. Col. Nicolae Dragomir (14 September 1940 - 24 January 1941)

References

Cabinets of Romania
Cabinets established in 1940
Cabinets disestablished in 1941
1940 establishments in Romania
1941 disestablishments in Romania